Odario Williams is a Canadian musician and broadcaster, currently heard as the host of the evening program Afterdark on CBC Music. In addition to Afterdark, Williams makes regular appearances on CBC Radio One's Q. Prior to that, he had guest-hosted Radio 2's The Signal and was the voice of CBC Radio 3. He was born in Guyana, and raised in Winnipeg, Manitoba. In addition to his work in radio, Williams is an actor, live DJ, model, and frontman for the Toronto hip hop collective Grand Analog. He was previously in the Winnipeg hip-hop group Mood Ruff.

He co-hosted the Juno Awards of 2020 alongside Damhnait Doyle.

References

CBC Radio hosts
Canadian male rappers
20th-century Canadian rappers
Black Canadian musicians
Black Canadian broadcasters
Musicians from Winnipeg
Canadian people of Guyanese descent
Living people
Year of birth missing (living people)
21st-century Canadian rappers
20th-century Canadian male musicians
21st-century Canadian male musicians